Ilona Ostrowska (born May 25, 1974) is a Polish actress.

In 1998 she graduated from the State Theatre School in Wrocław. She worked in Wrocław, Polish Theatre and the Theatre of K2. Since 2002 is an actress Contemporary Theatre in Warsaw. In 2004 she married actor and director Jacek Borcuch (divorce in 2012). In 2006 she gave birth to a daughter Miłosława. Popularity earned her the role of Lucy, a Polish-American in the series Ranczo by Wojciech Adamczyk.  Her father was a sailor, and her mother was a housewife.

Theatrical roles in Contemporary Theater
 2001: Imię, as Sister
 2001: Bambini di Praga, as Nadzia
 2003: Stracone zachody miłości, as Żankietta
 2004: Nieznajoma z Sekwany, as Irena
 2004: Pielęgniarki z nocnej zmiany

Roles in the TV Theater 
 1998: Prawiek i inne czasy, as Adelka
 1999: Historia PRL według Mrożka, as Journalist
 2001: Przemiana 1999, as Journalist
 2001: Siedem dalekich rejsów, as Anita

Filmography 
 1998: Życie jak poker, as Magda
 2000: M jak miłość
 2000: Sezon na leszcza
 2001: Głośniej od bomb, as Magda
 2002: Dzień świra
 2003: Marcinelle, as Mogile Ernesto
 2003: Na Wspólnej, as Owner of a car purchased by Leszek Nowak
 2004: Tulipany, as Ola
 2004: Długi weekend, as Wife of member
 2006-2016: Ranczo, as Lucy Wilska
 2007: Ranczo Wilkowyje, as Lucy Wilska
 2008: Ile waży koń trojański?, as Zosia
 2009: Droga do raju, as Ela
 2009: Naznaczony, as Attorney
 2010: Kołysanka as a reporter

References

External links
 

1974 births
20th-century Polish actresses
21st-century Polish actresses
Actors from Szczecin
Living people
Polish film actresses
Polish stage actresses
Polish television actresses